The 2014 Poznań Open was a professional tennis tournament played on clay courts. It was the eleventh edition of the tournament which was part of the 2014 ATP Challenger Tour. It took place at the Park Tenisowy Olimpia in Poznań, Poland from 12 to 20 July 2014, including the qualifying competition in the first two days.

Singles main-draw entrants

Seeds

Other entrants
The following players received wildcards into the singles main draw:
  Andriej Kapaś
  Błażej Koniusz
  Kamil Majchrzak
  Grzegorz Panfil

The following players received entry as an alternate into the singles main draw:
  Alex Bolt
  Germain Gigounon

The following players received entry from the qualifying draw:
  Wesley Koolhof
  Christian Garin
  Artem Smirnov
  Miljan Zekić

Withdrawals
Before the tournament
  Roberto Carballés Baena
  Guilherme Clezar
  Andrea Collarini
  Lucas Pouille

Doubles main-draw entrants

Seeds

Other entrants
The following pairs received wildcards into the doubles main draw:
  Marcin Gawron /  Grzegorz Panfil
  Mateusz Kowalczyk /  Maciej Smoła
  Kamil Majchrzak /  Jan Zieliński

The following pair received entry from the qualifying draw:
  Karol Drzewiecki /  Piotr Łomacki

Champions

Singles

 David Goffin def.  Blaž Rola, 6–4, 6–2

Doubles

 Radu Albot /  Adam Pavlásek def.  Tomasz Bednarek /  Henri Kontinen, 7–5, 2–6, [10–8]

References

External links
Official Website
ATP Challenger Tour

Poznań Open
Poznań Open
Poz